The American Air Mail Society (AAMS) is a U.S. nonprofit organization devoted to the collecting and study of airmail and aerophilately.

History
The society was founded in 1923 and is the second-oldest aerophilatelic society in the world. The Aerophilatelic Federation of the Americas merged with the society in 1995. The society currently has an international membership of 1,500 members.

Services provided
The society provides a number of services, including: auctions, merchandise sales, sales of covers and stamps, a translation service, slide presentations, advance bulletin service, awards, and chapters and study units. The society has also printed several books and it publishes the monthly magazine The Airpost Journal, as well as the American Air Mail Catalogue.

See also
 Aerophilately

References

External links
 

Philatelic organizations based in the United States
Airmail